COVID-19 vaccination in South Korea is an ongoing immunization campaign against severe acute respiratory syndrome coronavirus 2 (SARS-CoV-2), the virus that causes coronavirus disease 2019 (COVID-19), in response to the ongoing pandemic in the country.

Vaccination program 
Daily updates are provided by Korea Disease Control and Prevention Agency.

As of 5 July 2021, due to vaccine shortages, the vaccination rate has been slowed down since 20 June. The vaccination rate remains 29% for more than two weeks. According to JoongAng Ilbo, as of 5 July, the remaining amount of the COVID-19 vaccine is 1.8 million doses, including 1.4 million from Pfizer.

On 6 July 2021, it is reported that South Korea has signed a deal with Israel to borrow 700,000 expiring doses of the Pfizer-BioNTech's vaccine. South Korea will return the same amount of vaccines to Israel around September or October of this year.

On 29 November 2021, President Moon Jae-in urged the rapid administration of booster shots against COVID-19, in response to an increased number of severe cases and deaths following the easing of anti-virus rules.

Background 
On 10 February 2021, South Korea granted its first approval of a COVID-19 vaccine to Oxford–AstraZeneca, allowing the two-shot regimen to be administered to all adults, including the elderly. The approval came with a warning, however, that consideration is needed when administering the vaccine to individuals over 65 years of age due to limited data from that demographic in clinical trials.

On 14 April 2021, The additional 250,000 doses of Pfizer/BioNTech vaccines arrived in the country.

On 3 June 2021, the United States donated one million doses of Johnson & Johnson's vaccine to South Korea. The United States initially announced to donate 550,000 doses to South Korean troops working in close contact with American forces.

On 19 August 2021, Romania decided to donate 450,000 expiring Moderna vaccines to South Korea.

Vaccines on order

Timetable

Production 
AstraZeneca signed a deal with South Korea's SK Bioscience to manufacture its vaccine products. The collaboration calls for the SK Bioscience to manufacture AZD1222 for local and global markets. The World Health Organization approved AstraZeneca's COVID-19 vaccine for emergency use on February. The initial approval covers doses produced by AstraZeneca and South Korea's SK Bioscience.

South Korea's Korus Pharm has formed a consortium to produce Russia's Sputnik V COVID-19 vaccine. the consortium will produce 500 million doses of the vaccine. However, The Sputnik V doses manufactured in South Korea are not for domestic use. The vaccine is to be exported to Russia and UAE.

Novavax will license out its NVX-CoV2373 vaccine technology to SK Bioscience for contract manufacturing purposes. SK Bioscience will manufacture 40 million doses of Novavax vaccines.

Vaccines in trial stage 
On 9 January 2023, SK Bioscience submitted investigational new drug for GBP510 COVID-19 vaccine candidate to Korea Ministry of Food and Drug Safety, for Phase III clinical trial. SK Bioscience plans its Phase III trial in form of comparative effectiveness clinical trial, targeting 4,000 people in South Korea.

References

External links 

Vaccination campaign
South Korea